Nivernais was a province of France, around the city of Nevers, which forms the modern department of Nièvre. It roughly coincides with the former Duchy of Nevers.

The raw climate and soils cause the area to be heavily wooded.

Culture 
À la nivernaise refers to a cooking style involving a glaze, usually of butter and sugar, although sometimes involving butter and some other ingredient.

References 
 Chambers's Encyclopaedia, Vol. 10, p. 50

External links
 

 
Former provinces of France
History of Auvergne-Rhône-Alpes
History of Bourgogne-Franche-Comté
History of Centre-Val de Loire
History of Allier
History of Cher (department)
History of Nièvre
History of Yonne

Former duchies of France